The 2018–19 Wyoming Cowboys basketball team represented the University of Wyoming during the 2018–19 NCAA Division I men's basketball season. They were led by Allen Edwards in his third year as head coach at Wyoming. The Cowboys played their home games at the Arena-Auditorium in Laramie, Wyoming as members of the Mountain West Conference. They finished the season 8–24, 4–14 in Mountain West play to finish in tenth place. They lost in the first round of the Mountain West tournament to New Mexico.

Previous season
The Cowboys finished the 2017–18 season 20–13, 10–8 in Mountain West play to finish in sixth place. They defeated San Jose State in the first round of the Mountain West tournament before losing in the quarterfinals to New Mexico. They did not compete in a post-season tournament.

Offseason

Departures

Source

Incoming transfers

2018 recruiting class

Source

Roster

Statistics

Schedule and results

|-
!colspan=9 style=| Exhibition

|-
!colspan=9 style=| Non-conference regular season

|-
!colspan=9 style=| Mountain West regular season

|-
!colspan=9 style=| Mountain West tournament

Source

References

Wyoming Cowboys basketball seasons
Wyoming
Wyoming Cowboys bask
Wyoming Cowboys bask